Club Universitario de La Plata is an Argentine sports club headquartered in La Plata, Buenos Aires Province. Universitario hosts the practise of a wide range of sports and activities that includes basketball, beach volleyball, bowls, fencing, field hockey, gymnastics, judo, paddle tennis, rugby union, roller skating, rowing, swimming, tejo, tennis, volleyball, water polo and yoga.

The rugby union senior squad currently plays in Primera División A, the second division of the Unión de Rugby de Buenos Aires league system, while the field hockey teams are affiliated to the Buenos Aires Hockey Association (AHBA).

History
The first rugby team was formed about 1926 but Universitario would not be affiliated to Argentine Rugby Union until 1928, after having been recommended by Club Universitario de Buenos Aires (CUBA) and Club Atlético San Isidro, which served as sponsors.

The gymnastics teacher Benigno Rodríguez Jurado, also a CUBA player and father of Arturo (who would win a gold medal for Argentina in 1928), taught the rugby union rules to a group of young enthusiasts. This is considered the beginning of Club Universitario de La Plata as a rugby union club.

In 1959 the Government of the Province of Buenos Aires donated lands to Club Universitario in order to build club's facilities. Those lands were located in Manuel B. Gonnet, in La Plata Partido. During the decade of the 1970s Universitario added a children's division to its rugby categories.

The club would be promoted and relegated to lower divisions during the 1980s and 1990s, even reaching the first division in 1996 although Universitario did not last too much time in that level. In 2004 Universitario achieved its second promotion to first division although the team would be soon relegated to the second division, Torneo de la URBA Grupo II

In 2013, Universitario promoted to first division to play the 2014 season.

Facilities
The club has three different facilities where several sports are practised, they are:

 Deportiva: located in Manuel Gonnet, basketball, field hockey, paddle tennis, rugby union, volleyball and swimming can be practised there.
 Náutica: In Ensenada, with services area for sailing ships, it hosted the practise of basketball, beach volleyball, bowls, rolling skate, swimming, tejo and tennis (clay court).
 Social: In La Plata, where the club is headquartered. Volleyball, gymnastics, fencing, judo, yoga can be practised there. There are also dance rooms.

References

External links
 

u
U
u
1937 establishments in Argentina